Captain Prince Antônio Gastão of Orléans-Braganza MC (9 August 1881 – 29 November 1918) was a Brazilian prince who served in the forces of the British Empire during World War I.

Life

Antônio was born in Paris, the third and last son of Isabel, Princess Imperial of Brazil, and her husband Gaston of Orléans, Count of Eu. His father was a grandson of the last king of France, Louis Philippe I, and his mother was the eldest daughter and heir of Emperor Pedro II of Brazil. He was baptised on 27 August 1881. His full name was Antônio Gastão Luiz Filipe Francisco de Assis Maria Miguel Rafael Gabriel Gonzaga; his family affectionately called him "Totó".

After his grandfather was deposed in a military coup in Brazil, he and his family were sent into exile in Europe. As a child he was chronically sick with bronchitis. He was educated in Paris, and at the Theresian Military Academy in Wiener Neustadt, Austria. After graduation, he was a Hussar lieutenant in the Austro-Hungarian Army between 1908 and 1914.

When World War I broke out, Antônio was prevented from joining the French armed forces by a law that forbade members of the deposed French royal family from serving in the military. Instead, he was commissioned as a lieutenant in the Royal Canadian Dragoons where he served attached to the Royal Flying Corps as intelligence officer. He was promoted to captain in 1916, and was awarded the Military Cross in 1917. He was aide-de-camp to the commander of the Canadian Cavalry Brigade, Brigadier-General Seely, from February 1917 until May 1918, and then was seconded for duty with the War Office in July.

Antônio died from injuries sustained in an air crash at Edmonton, London, shortly after the end of the war. His remains were placed in the Royal Chapel of Dreux, in France.

Honors

  Knight Grand Cross of the Order of Pedro I
  Knight Grand Cross of the Order of the Rose
  Knight Grand Cross of the Order of Christ
  Knight Grand Cross of the Order of Charles III
  Knight Grand Cross of the Order of Merit
  Knight Grand Cross of the Order of the Rising Sun
  Natal Native Rebellion Medal with clasp of South Africa
  Knight of the Legion of Honour of France

Ancestry

External links

 Royal Canadian Dragoons service file

References 

1881 births
1918 deaths
Accidental deaths in London
Austro-Hungarian military personnel
Aviators killed in aviation accidents or incidents in England
Burials at the Chapelle royale de Dreux
Canadian Expeditionary Force officers
House of Orléans-Braganza
Nobility from Paris
Recipients of the Military Cross
Recipients of the Order of the Rising Sun
Royal Flying Corps officers
Chevaliers of the Légion d'honneur
Victims of aviation accidents or incidents in 1918
British Army personnel of World War I
Military personnel from Paris
Royal Canadian Dragoons officers
Theresian Military Academy alumni